

U.S. Bank Building, formerly 190 South LaSalle Street, is a  tall skyscraper in Chicago, Illinois. It was completed in 1987 and has 40 floors. Johnson/Burgee Architects designed the building, which is the 57th tallest building in Chicago. From 1988-2016 the lobby of the building featured a tapestry by Helena Hernmarck titled "The 1909 Plan of Chicago" depicting the Civic Center Plaza proposed in the Burnham Plan of Chicago.

The terms of the lease also gave the bank naming rights for the building through 2026.

Gallery

See also
List of tallest buildings in Chicago

References
Notes

External links

Skyscraper office buildings in Chicago
Office buildings completed in 1987
Philip Johnson buildings
Leadership in Energy and Environmental Design certified buildings
1987 establishments in Illinois